Caíque Calito Fernandes Costa (born 3 July 2000), commonly known as Caíque, is a Brazilian footballer who plays for Tombense.

Career statistics

Club

Notes

References

2000 births
Living people
Brazilian footballers
Brazilian expatriate footballers
Association football forwards
Footballers from São Paulo
Associação Atlética Francana players
Vila Nova Futebol Clube players
CE Operário Várzea-Grandense players
Tombense Futebol Clube players
FC Porto players
FC Porto B players
Brazilian expatriate sportspeople in Portugal
Expatriate footballers in Portugal